Onajite Paul Okoloko is a Nigerian entrepreneur. He is currently Group Chief Executive Officer / Managing Director of Notore Chemical Industries Plc (“Notore”). He is also the Chairman of Midwestern Oil & Gas Limited (“Midwestern”) and the Chairman of Eroton Exploration & Production Limited (“Eroton”).

Education and Personal Life
Okoloko graduated from the University of Benin in 1986 with a bachelor's degree in Economics and is an alumnus of Harvard Business School. He is married with four children.

Early career
Okoloko lived and worked in the United States prior to his return to Nigeria in 1994 to work in the oil industry. In the US, Okoloko worked in sales, marketing and business development. Okoloko's business ethos is driven by a desire for indigenous ownership and operating of business, developing local management talent and encouraging community participation.

Companies

Ocean and Oil

Okoloko was a founding member of the Ocean and Oil Group alongside Adewale Tinubu, Omamofe Boyo and Osaze Osifo. In 1994, what started out as an oil trading company eventually acquired Unipetrol Nigeria Plc during the Federal Government of Nigeria's privatization exercise in 2000. Ocean and Oil went on to acquire other assets, including Agip Nigeria Plc (the oil marketing arm of the ENI Group in Nigeria) and listed a subsidiary (Oando Plc) on the Nigerian and Johannesburg Stock Exchanges.

Okoloko left the Ocean and Oil Group of Companies in 2005.

Notore

Okoloko is the Group Chief Executive Officer/Managing Director of Notore Chemical Industries Plc (“Notore”). Up until 2015, Notore was the only producer of urea fertiliser in Sub-Saharan Africa.
Okoloko led a consortium of international and local investors to buy the defunct National Fertilizer Company of Nigeria (NAFCON) through a privatisation round led by the Bureau of Public Enterprises (BPE) between 2004 and 2005. NAFCON, which was originally built by KBR in the 1980s, was a flagship urea producer with over 100% efficiency until it was taken over by the Nigerian Government and subsequently shut down. Post-acquisition, Okoloko successfully completed the largest single loan syndication of Nigerian banks at the time, enabling Notore to raise US$222 million amongst 7 Nigerian financial institutions and completed a successful rehabilitation after it lay idle for more than 10 years.

Post-acquisition, Okoloko was instrumental in campaigning for reform in the Nigerian agricultural sector, lobbying the government to move away from a subsidy based system of fertiliser distribution to a comprehensive and sustainable methodology that encouraged self-sufficiency. His campaign was called “the African Green Revolution.”

Leveraging on his experience in sales and marketing, Okoloko guided Notore into offering different bag sizes of fertiliser to fit the different cash points of each farming group.

Notore quickly developed a marketing and distribution network under Okoloko that covered Nigeria and was cited by several multilateral agencies where Notore's marketing efforts were credited in increasing fertiliser use.

Foreseeing structural challenges with production capacity, to head off future supply shortages as the market grew, Okoloko led Notore to secure a joint venture agreement with Mitsubishi Corporation for the development of a Train II Plant with 1,000,000 tons of urea production capacity and 500,000 tons of methanol.
 
Between 2013 and 2014, Notore suffered from gas supply shortages that compromised its production when at the time it had a 20-year gas contract with the Nigerian Gas Company (NGC), which could no longer guarantee regular supply. In order to secure the long-term viability of Notore, Okoloko, leveraging on his upstream oil and gas experience via his investments in another entity, Midwestern Oil & Gas Limited, put together another consortium to acquire an oil mining lease from the Shell Petroleum Development Corporation (“SPDC”). A new entity was formed and called Eroton Exploration & Production. Covering an area of 1,035 square kilometres and just 14 kilometres from Notore, the new entity holds significant oil and gas reserves for Notore's current and future needs.

Midwestern Oil & Gas

Midwestern Oil & Gas Company Limited (“Midwestern”) commenced operation in 2003. Onajite Okoloko again led a consortium of investors in the company to participate in the marginal field licensing round during which they were awarded a 70% interest in the Umusadege oil field located in Oil Mining Lease (“OML”) 56, which is situated at the northern area of Delta State, Nigeria. Being a strong advocate for indigenous ownership and operatorship of hydrocarbon assets at a time when the space was dominated by International Oil Companies (“IoC’s),  Okoloko was instrumental in putting together a management team of local professionals that would successfully operate the asset, having initially secured technical assistance from Mart Resources (a Canadian listed Natural Resources entity) in the early years of Midwestern, pursuant to Okoloko’s team which took over and continue to manage the asset to date.

A total of fifteen (15) wells have been drilled to date; the company has achieved success through its ability to peacefully coexist with the host communities. Okoloko eventually led Midwestern to acquire Mart Resources taking it private in 2016.
                                      
Midwestern achieved another commendable milestone in 2016 when the company celebrated nine Million Man-Hours LTI-Free operations. Midwestern has also received several awards and recognitions by notable international bodies for achievements in HSE; in 2013 the company won the prestigious Africa Oil and Gas Award for Health Safety and Environment (HSE). The company was cited for attaining six million man-hours loss time injury (LTI) free operation in its Umusadege marginal field. Midwestern is recognised as the largest and most successful venture in the history of the Nigerian National Petroleum Corporation (“NNPC”) marginal field divestment program. 
As Chairman, Okoloko has also overseen an aggressive CSR policy over the years which has contributed meaningfully to the social and economic development of its host communities and improved the quality of life of the people, their families and the society at large.

Eroton Exploration and Production Company Limited

In 2014 Okoloko led a consortium of investors to acquire Shell's 45% working interest in OML 18 for US$1,200 billion in a transaction that was awarded the “Global Structured Finance Transaction of 2014” by Trade & Forfaiting Review (TFR) 

Between Eroton and Midwestern, Okoloko as Chairman oversees a combined daily production capacity of approximately eighty thousand barrels of crude oil per day and 100mscf of natural gas production. Estimates forecast that Eroton holds significant prospective natural gas resources alongside undiscovered volumes of condensate and associated hydrocarbons. As Chairman, Okoloko personally oversaw the development and implementation of Eroton's CSR and security strategy. Historically, OML 18 was synonymous with militancy and vandalism of oil installations; to date Eroton has not experienced any downtime related to illegal activities in its operating area. In 2016, Okoloko led the investment of San Leon Energy, a UK listed AIM company, in OML 18 through Eroton.

Awards, memberships and recognition
 Okoloko is a member of the Nigerian Economic Summit (Policy Formulation) Group and the National Technical Working Group of the Nigeria Vision 2020. He is also a member of the President's Agricultural Transformation Implementation Council, which was inaugurated in May 2012.
 In 2014, Okoloko was appointed as an inaugural member of the Human Capital and Innovation Capacity Building Working Group of the National Competitiveness Council of Nigeria.
 In 2004, Okoloko was appointed a member of the Presidential Committee on Oil and Gas, as the sole representative of the private sector. This committee was instrumental in developing the current Oil and Gas policy for the country.
 In 2014, Okoloko was appointed to the Governing Council of the Delta State University Nigeria.
 Okoloko counts golf and cricket as his pastimes and is a former Chairman of the Delta State Cricket Board and a serving member of the National Cricket Association, where he is a keen advocate for the development of cricket in Nigeria.

References

21st-century Nigerian businesspeople
Harvard Business School alumni
Year of birth missing (living people)
Living people
University of Benin (Nigeria) alumni
Nigerian chairpersons of corporations